wxWidgets (formerly wxWindows) is a widget toolkit and tools library for creating graphical user interfaces (GUIs) for cross-platform applications. wxWidgets enables a program's GUI code to compile and run on several computer platforms with minimal or no code changes. A wide choice of compilers and other tools to use with wxWidgets facilitates development of sophisticated applications. wxWidgets supports a comprehensive range of popular operating systems and graphical libraries, both proprietary and free, and is widely deployed in prominent organizations (see text).

The project was started under the name wxWindows in 1992 by Julian Smart at the University of Edinburgh. The project was renamed wxWidgets in 2004 in response to a trademark claim by Microsoft UK.

It is free and open source software, distributed under the terms of the wxWidgets Licence, which satisfies those who wish to produce for GPL and proprietary software.

Portability and deployment
wxWidgets covers systems such as Microsoft Windows, Mac OS (Carbon and Cocoa), iOS (Cocoa Touch), Linux/Unix (X11, Motif, and GTK), OpenVMS, OS/2 and AmigaOS. A version for embedded systems is under development.

wxWidgets is used across many industry sectors, most notably by Xerox, Advanced Micro Devices (AMD), Lockheed Martin, NASA and the Center for Naval Analyses. It is also used in the public sector and education by, for example, Dartmouth Medical School, National Human Genome Research Institute, National Center for Biotechnology Information, and many others. wxWidgets is used in many open source projects, and by individual developers.

History
wxWidgets (initially wxWindows) was started in 1992 by Julian Smart at the University of Edinburgh. He attained an honours degree in Computational science from the University of St Andrews in 1986, and is still a core developer.

On February 20, 2004, the developers of wxWindows announced that the project was changing its name to wxWidgets, as a result of Microsoft requesting Julian Smart to respect Microsoft's United Kingdom trademark of the term Windows.

Major release versions were 2.4 on 6 January 2003, 2.6 on 21 April 2005 and 2.8.0 on 14 December 2006. Version 3.0 was released on 11 November, 2013.

wxWidgets has participated in the Google Summer of Code since 2006.

The following table contains the release history of wxWidgets, showing all of its major release versions.

License

wxWidgets is distributed under a custom made wxWindows Licence, similar to the GNU Lesser General Public License (LGPL), with an exception stating that derived works in binary form may be distributed on the user's own terms. This license is a free software license approved by the FSF, making wxWidgets free software. It has been approved by the Open Source Initiative (OSI).

Official support

Supported platforms
wxWidgets is supported on the following platforms:
 Windows –  (32/64-bits Windows XP up to Windows 10)
 Linux/Unix – wxGTK, wxX11, wxMotif
 Mac OS – wxMac (Mac OS X 10.3 using Carbon, Mac OS X 10.5 using Cocoa),  (32/64-bits Mac OS X 10.7 or later)
 OS/2 – wxOS2, wxWidgets for GTK or Motif can be compiled on OS/2
 Embedded platforms – wxEmbedded

External ports
 Amiga – wxWidgets-AOS: AmigaOS port (Work In Progress)

Supported compilers
wxWidgets is officially confirmed to work properly with the following compilers:

Programming language bindings 

The wxWidgets library is implemented in C++, with bindings available for many commonly used programming languages.

wxWidgets is best described as a native mode toolkit as it provides a thin abstraction to a platform's native widgets, contrary to emulating the display of widgets using graphic primitives. Calling a native widget on the target platform results in a more native looking interface than toolkits such as Swing (for Java), as well as offering performance and other benefits.

The toolkit is also not restricted to GUI development, having an inter-process communication layer, socket networking functionality, and more.

RAD tools and IDEs for wxWidgets

There are many Rapid Application Development (RAD) and Integrated Development Environment (IDE) tools available. Notable tools include:
 Code::Blocks (via wxSmith plugin)
 CodeLite (via wxCrafter plugin)
 wxFormBuilder

Applications built using wxWidgets

Notable applications that use wxWidgets:
 0 A.D. – a FOSS video game similar to Age of Empires
 Amaya – web authoring tool
 aMule – peer-to-peer file sharing application
 ActivePresenter – screen recorder, video editor & e-learning application
 Audacity – cross-platform sound editor
 BitTorrent – peer-to-peer file sharing application
Berkeley Open Infrastructure for Network Computing – an open-source middleware system
 Code::Blocks – C/C++ IDE
 CodeLite – simple C++ Editor (Collection of free Tools, implemented by plugins)
 FileZilla – FTP client
 FreeFileSync – a free and open-source file synchronization software
 GrandOrgue – virtual pipe organ simulator
 Guayadeque Music Player – a music player with database
 Hollywood – uses wxWidgets in its RapaGUI plugin
 KiCad – a free software suite for electronic design automation (EDA)
 RapidSVN – Subversion client
 RocketCake – WYSIWYG responsive website builder
 TortoiseCVS – CVS client

See also

 FLTK – a light, cross platform, non-native widget toolkit
 FOX toolkit – a fast, open source, cross-platform widget toolkit
 GTK – the GIMP toolkit, a widget toolkit used by GNOME applications
 gtkmm – C++ version of GTK
 Juce – an extensive cross-platform widget toolkit
 IUP – a multi-platform toolkit for building native graphical user interfaces
 Qt (toolkit) – an application framework used by KDE applications
 Ultimate++ – a C++ cross-platform development framework
 Widget toolkit
 List of widget toolkits

References

Further reading

External links

 

 
1992 software
C++ libraries
Cross-platform software
Free computer libraries
Free software programmed in C++
Widget toolkits
X-based libraries